"Losing My Religion" is a song by American alternative rock band R.E.M., released in February 1991 as the first single from the group's seventh album, Out of Time (1991). Built on a mandolin riff, the song was an unlikely hit for the group, garnering extensive airplay on radio as well as on MTV and VH1 due to its critically acclaimed music video. The single became R.E.M.'s highest-charting hit in the United States, reaching No. 4 on the Billboard Hot 100 and expanding the group's popularity beyond its original fanbase. At the 1992 Grammy Awards, "Losing My Religion" won two awards: Best Short Form Music Video and Best Pop Performance by a Duo or Group with Vocal.

Background
R.E.M. guitarist Peter Buck wrote the main riff and chorus to the song on a mandolin while watching television one day. Buck had just bought the instrument and was attempting to learn how to play it, recording the music as he practiced. Buck said that "when I listened back to it the next day, there was a bunch of stuff that was really just me learning how to play mandolin, and then there's what became 'Losing My Religion', and then a whole bunch more of me learning to play the mandolin."

Recording of the song started in September 1990 at Bearsville Studio A in Woodstock, New York. The song was arranged in the studio with mandolin, electric bass, and drums. Bassist Mike Mills came up with a bassline inspired by the work of Fleetwood Mac bassist John McVie; by his own admission he could not come up with one for the song that was not derivative. Buck said the arrangement of the song "had a hollow feel to it. There's absolutely no midrange on it, just low end and high end, because Mike usually stayed pretty low on the bass." The band decided to have touring guitarist Peter Holsapple play acoustic guitar on the recording. Buck reflected, "It was really cool: Peter and I would be in our little booth, sweating away, and Bill and Mike would be out there in the other room going at it. It just had a really magical feel." Singer Michael Stipe's vocals were recorded in a single take. Orchestral strings, arranged by Mark Bingham, were added to the song by members of the Atlanta Symphony Orchestra at Soundscape Studios in Atlanta, Georgia, in October 1990.

Composition and lyrics
"Losing My Religion" is based on Peter Buck's mandolin-playing. Buck said, "The verses are the kinds of things R.E.M. uses a lot, going from one minor to another, kind [of] like those 'Driver 8' chords. You can't really say anything bad about E minor, A minor, D, and G – I mean, they're just good chords." Buck noted that "Losing My Religion" was "probably the most typical R.E.M.-sounding song on the record. We are trying to get away from those kind of songs, but like I said before, those are some good chords." Orchestral strings play through parts of the song. The song is in natural minor.

Stipe has repeatedly stated that the song's lyrics are not about religion. The phrase "losing my religion" is an expression from the southern region of the United States that means "losing one's temper or civility" or "feeling frustrated and desperate." Stipe told The New York Times the song was about romantic expression. He told Q that "Losing My Religion" is about "someone who pines for someone else. It's unrequited love, what have you." Stipe compared the song's theme to "Every Breath You Take" (1983) by The Police, saying, "It's just a classic obsession pop song. I've always felt the best kinds of songs are the ones where anybody can listen to it, put themselves in it and say, 'Yeah, that's me.'"

In a 2020 interview for Song Exploder, a Netflix series, Bill Berry was reminded that handclaps were introduced later in the song. He was first played a stripped-down version of the song, featuring just his drum line and the handclaps. He was surprised to hear them and asked, "I wonder if they're in the mix. Is that the demo?" He was then played the final version of the song. "They are there!" he said, upon hearing it. "Wow. That's wild. I'm just flummoxed right now. It's thirty years ago; I'm sorry I didn't remember that."

Release and performance
"Losing My Religion" was released on February 19, 1991, in the United States as the lead single from R.E.M.'s forthcoming album Out of Time. The band's record label, Warner Bros., was wary about the group's choice of the song as the album's first single. Steven Baker, who was vice president of product management at Warner Bros. at the time, said there were "long, drawn-out discussions" about releasing such an "unconventional track" as the single until the label agreed. While R.E.M. declined to tour to promote Out of Time, the band visited radio stations, gave numerous press interviews, and made appearances on MTV to promote the record. Meanwhile, Warner Bros. worked to establish the single at campus, modern rock, and album-oriented rock radio stations before promoting it to American Top 40 stations, where it became a success. "The record crosses the boundaries of being just an alternative record", one Top 40 radio station program director said; he admitted that "Losing My Religion" was "a hard record to program; you can't play L.L. Cool J behind it. But it's a real pop record—you can dance to it."

"Losing My Religion" became R.E.M.'s biggest hit in the U.S., peaking at No. 4 on the Billboard Hot 100. The single stayed on the chart for 21 weeks. It topped both the Billboard Album Rock Tracks and Modern Rock Tracks charts, for three and eight weeks respectively, also personal bests for the band on both charts. It charted at number 19 on the UK Singles Chart, and peaked at No. 16 and No. 11 in Canada and Australia, respectively. Mills said years later, "Without 'Losing My Religion', Out of Time would have sold two or three million [copies], instead of the ten [million copies] or so it did. But the phenomenon that is a worldwide hit is an odd thing to behold. Basically that record was a hit in almost every civilised country in the world." The success of "Losing My Religion" and Out of Time broadened R.E.M.'s audience beyond its original college radio fanbase. When asked at the time if he was worried that the song's success might alienate older fans, Buck told Rolling Stone, "The people that changed their minds because of 'Losing My Religion' can just kiss my ass."

Critical reception
A reviewer from Music & Media wrote, "Hearing such a beautiful song with a striking mandolin arrangement, provides an ample religious substitute." Parry Gettelman from Orlando Sentinel remarked that here, the band returns to its "trademark jangle", "but Buck employs a mandolin instead of a Rickenbacker. Stipe touches again on what seems to be ambivalence about his role as a pop star, and about the need to communicate with an audience." David Fricke from Rolling Stone felt that "there is melancholy in the air: in the doleful strings and teardrop mandolin of "Losing My Religion". Celia Farber from Spin praised it as "a gorgeous, gorgeous song." She added, "When Stipe sings "That's me in the corner/That's me in the spotlight losing my religion", I actually get a hot/cold flash and have to play the song about 30 more times. Right away."

The single placed second in the Village Voice Pazz & Jop annual critics' poll, behind Nirvana's "Smells Like Teen Spirit". R.E.M. was nominated for seven awards at the 1992 Grammy Awards. "Losing My Religion" alone earned several nominations, including Record of the Year and Song of the Year. The song won two awards, for Best Pop Performance by a Duo or Group with Vocals and Best Short Form Music Video. In 2004, Rolling Stone listed the song at No. 169 on its list of the "500 Greatest Songs of All Time". In 2007, the song was listed as No. 9 on VH1's 100 Greatest Songs of the 90s. In 2009, Blender ranked it at No. 79 on its list of "The 500 Greatest Songs Since You Were Born". The song is also included on The Rock and Roll Hall of Fame's list of 500 Songs that Shaped Rock and Roll.

Music video
The accompanying music video for "Losing My Religion" was directed by Tarsem Singh. As opposed to previous R.E.M. videos, Michael Stipe agreed to lip sync the lyrics. The video originated as a combination of ideas envisioned by Stipe and Singh. Stipe wanted the promo to be a straightforward performance video, akin to Sinéad O'Connor's "Nothing Compares 2 U". Singh wanted to create a video in the style of a certain type of Indian filmmaking, where everything would be "melodramatic and very dreamlike", according to Stipe. Singh has said the video is modeled after the Gabriel Garcia Marquez short story "A Very Old Man with Enormous Wings" in which an angel crashes into a town and the villagers have varied reactions to him.

The video begins with a brief sequence inside a dark room where water drips from an open window. Recreating a scene from the Andrei Tarkovsky film The Sacrifice, Buck, Berry, and Mills run across the room while Stipe remains seated as a pitcher of milk drops from the windowsill and shatters; the song then begins. Director Singh also drew inspiration from the Italian painter Caravaggio and the video is laden with religious imagery such as Saint Sebastian, the Biblical episode of the Incredulity of Thomas and Hindu deities, portrayed in a series of tableaux. Actor Wade Dominguez (1966-1998), who played Emilio in Dangerous Minds (1995), appears in the music video.

The music video was nominated in nine categories at the 1991 MTV Video Music Awards. The video won six awards, including Video of the Year, Best Group Video, Breakthrough Video, Best Art Direction, Best Direction, and Best Editing. "Losing My Religion" also ranked second in the music video category of the 1991 Pazz & Jop poll.

The music video hit one billion views on YouTube in September 2022, becoming the band's first video to do so.

MTV performances
On November 10, 1991, R.E.M. performed "Losing My Religion" with members of the Atlanta Symphony Orchestra to celebrate the tenth anniversary of MTV. It was recorded at the Morgan Cultural Centre in Madison, Georgia, about twenty miles south of Athens.

They also performed the song earlier in the year for MTV Unplugged, and again in 2001.

Personnel
R.E.M.
 Bill Berry – drums, percussion
 Peter Buck – electric guitar, mandolin
 Mike Mills – bass guitar, backing vocals, keyboards and arrangement
 Michael Stipe – lead vocals

Additional musicians
 Peter Holsapple – acoustic guitar

Track listing
All songs were written by Bill Berry, Peter Buck, Mike Mills, and Michael Stipe except where noted.

7-inch
 "Losing My Religion" – 4:29
 "Rotary Eleven" – 2:32

12-inch and compact disc
 "Losing My Religion" – 4:29
 "Rotary Eleven" – 2:32
 "After Hours" (Lou Reed) (Live)1 – 2:08

UK "Collector's Edition" CD one
 "Losing My Religion" – 4:29
 "Stand" (Live)1 – 3:21
 "Turn You Inside-Out" (Live)1 – 4:23
 "World Leader Pretend" (Live)1 – 4:24

UK "Collector's Edition" CD two
 "Losing My Religion" – 4:29
 "Fretless" – 4:51
 "Losing My Religion" (Live acoustic version/Rockline) – 4:38
 "Rotary Eleven" – 2:32

Notes
 1. Taken from the live performance video, Tourfilm.

Charts and certifications

Weekly charts

Year-end charts

Certifications

Release history

Covers
Finn Hudson (Cory Monteith) covered the song in the 2010 Glee episode "Grilled Cheesus". The song reached number 60 in the US on the Billboard Hot 100 and number 47 on the Canadian Hot 100.

Tori Amos recorded a cover version which appeared in the film Higher Learning.

Italian band Lacuna Coil covered the song on their 2012 album Dark Adrenaline.

Canadian singer-songwriter Dan Mangan covered the song on his 2020 album Thief.

References

Bibliography
 Black, Johnny. Reveal: The Story of R.E.M. Backbeat Books, 2004. 
 Buckley, David. R.E.M.: Fiction: An Alternative Biography. Virgin, 2002. 

1991 singles
R.E.M. songs
Ultratop 50 Singles (Flanders) number-one singles
Dutch Top 40 number-one singles
MTV Video of the Year Award
Song recordings produced by Scott Litt
Song recordings produced by Michael Stipe
Song recordings produced by Bill Berry
Song recordings produced by Peter Buck
Song recordings produced by Mike Mills
Songs written by Bill Berry
Songs written by Michael Stipe
Songs written by Mike Mills
Songs written by Peter Buck
Abigail (singer) songs
Tori Amos songs
Warner Records singles
American folk rock songs
Grammy Award for Best Short Form Music Video
1990 songs
Music videos directed by Tarsem Singh
MTV Video Music Award for Best Direction